Richard A. Harewood (June 25, 1900 - 1985) was a lawyer, state legislator, and judge in Illinois. He was born in Barbados.
He was a Republican before becoming a Democrat in the 1950s. 

He graduated from the University of Illinois, and University of Chicago Law School.

See also
List of African-American officeholders (1900–1959)

References

African-American state legislators in Illinois
African-American lawyers
African-American judges
1900 births
1985 deaths
20th-century African-American politicians
African-American men in politics
20th-century American politicians
20th-century American lawyers
20th-century American judges
Illinois Republicans
Barbadian emigrants to the United States
Illinois state court judges
Illinois Democrats
University of Illinois alumni
University of Chicago Law School alumni
Members of the Illinois House of Representatives